James Elias Bassett Jr. (October 18, 1912 – September 26, 1978) was an American newspaper editor and author, most notably of the best-selling novel Harm's Way, which was later adapted into the motion picture In Harm's Way.

Biography
The son of James E. and Lucille R. Bassett, Bassett was born in Glendale, California.

Raised in Mamaroneck, New York, from 1914 on, in 1934 he graduated cum laude from Bowdoin College in Maine, where he was a member of Phi Beta Kappa.  After college, he returned to Los Angeles and joined the Los Angeles Times as a reporter. He later served the paper as aviation writer, political analyst and director of the editorial pages until he was named associate editor in 1971. At the Mirror, the Times''' sister publication, he held the posts of political editor, feature editor and city editor.

Bassett entered the United States Navy as lieutenant (junior grade) in February 1941. He and his wife were in Hawaii during the attack on Pearl Harbor, as Bassett was serving on the public relations staff of Admiral Husband E. Kimmel. Bassett went on to become public relations officer for Fleet Admiral William F. (Bull) Halsey and was awarded the Bronze Star with combat V. Bassett later retired from the service as a captain, and returned to work at the Times. 

Bassett took leaves from the Times to serve in Richard Nixon's vice presidential and presidential campaigns of 1952, 1956 and 1960. He was public relations director for the Republican National Committee in 1954.

Bassett drew on his World War II experiences for his novel Harm's Way, which became a bestseller after its publication in 1962 and was made into the motion picture In Harm's Way starring John Wayne, Kirk Douglas, and Henry Fonda and directed by Otto Preminger. Other works by Bassett include Commander Prince, USN, published in 1971, a novel dealing mainly with the events surrounding the Battle of the Java Sea, and The Sky Suspended, published in 1968.

Bassett retired October 1977 after serving 43 years on the staffs of the Los Angeles Times and Mirror''.  He was working on two books at the time of his death—one an autobiography and the other a volume on great sea admirals he had observed in the Pacific Theater of World War II. He died in Malibu, California, and was survived by his wife and a daughter. His ashes were scattered at sea.

Notes

References

Further reading

External links

Guide to the James E. Bassett Jr. Papers at Bowdoin.edu

1912 births
1978 deaths
Bowdoin College alumni
People from Greater Los Angeles
United States Navy personnel of World War II
People from Mamaroneck, New York
20th-century American novelists
20th-century American journalists
20th-century American male writers
American male novelists
American male journalists
American male non-fiction writers
United States Navy captains